The Weser Hills (Wesergebirge), also known in German as the Weserkette ("Weser Chain"), form a low hill chain, up to , in the Weser Uplands in the German states of North Rhine-Westphalia and Lower Saxony.

The thickly wooded Weser ridge is one of the northern outliers of the German Central Uplands on the southern edge of the North German Plain and forms part of the TERRA.vita Nature Park in the west and Weser Uplands Schaumburg-Hameln Nature Park in the east.

The Weser Hills are widely known because of Schaumburg Castle which stands on the Nesselberg (c. ) in the Schaumburg district of the town of Rinteln, and is the emblem of Schaumburg Land.

Geography 
The Weser Hills cross the counties of Minden-Lübbecke, Schaumburg and Hameln-Pyrmont in a roughly east–west direction, from the town of  Porta Westfalica and the Westphalian Gap in the west past Rinteln to Hessisch Oldendorf in the east, where they transition seamlessly to the Süntel, a ridge of similar height running from northwest to southeast. They form part of the perimeter of the Weser Uplands and thus also the German Central Uplands which lie south of the North German Plain.

North of the Weser Hills there are only a few hills of the Calenberg Uplands, such as the nearby ridges of Harrl and Bückeberge. To the west, on the other side of the Porta Westfalica, the chain continues as the Wiehen Hills, geologically of similar formation, reaching Bramsche (northwest of  Osnabrück).

South of the Weser Hills, and roughly parallel to them, flows the River Weser, from Hessisch-Oldendorf in the east, through Rinteln, towards Vlotho in the west, before turning northeast to the town of Porta Westfalica. These northern areas around the Upper Weser Valley, south of the hills are an old area of settlement, which was protected by Schaumburg Castle on the hill of Nesselberg. From the water gap at Porta Westfalica - the Westphalian Gap -  the river swings north in order to reach the southern part of the North German Plain. North of the hills are the upper reaches of the Aue (also called the Bückeburger Aue) that run roughly east to west.

Hills 
In its centre section, west of the A 2 motorway, they reach a maximum height of 278 m at the Wülpker Egge and a height of 235.2 m at the westernmost hill of the Weser chain, the Jakobsberg, which is located east of Porta Westfalica and on which the Jakobsberg transmission tower stands.

The hills and elevations of the Wesergebirge, as seen from west to east, are given below together with their heights in metres above Normalnull (NN)
:
 Jakobsberg (235,2 m), with Jakobsberg Telecommunication Tower, Schlageter Monument and Porta Kanzel; north-northeast of the town of Porta Westfalica by the Porta Westfalica gorge
 Königsberg (c. 225 m); northeast of Porta Westfalica
 Roter Brink (c. 225 m), and Nammer Lager; south-southwest of Nammen
 Lohfelder Berg (215,2 m); northeast of Lohfeld
 Nammer Klippe (248,8 m); nature reserve; south of Nammen
 Nammer Kopf (266,3 m), and the Nammer Klippe, nature reserve; south-southeast of Nammen
 Wülpker Egge (c. 278 m), with a quarry; south of Wülpke
 Rote Klippe (c. 220 m), with a quarry; south of Kleinenbremen
 Papenbrink (303 m), with transmission facility and a quarry; north-northwest of Todenmann
 Lange Wand (320,1 m); in the Hainholz State Forest northeast of Todenmann
 Frankenburg-Berg (c. 235 m), and ruins of the Frankenburg; spur of the Langen Wand north of  Rinteln-Todenmann
 Luhdener Klippe (c. 300 m), and the 19.8 m high Klippe Tower; north-northeast of Rinteln
 Hirschkuppe (250,1 m); northeast of Rinteln
 Messingsberg (270,1 m), with a quarry; north-northeast of Rinteln-Steinbergen
 Westendorfer Egge (c. 295 m), with a quarry; north-northeast of Rinteln-Westendorf
 Oberberg (325,2 m), and the Springsteinen; north of Rinteln-Schaumburg
 Heutzeberg (225,5 m); spur of the Oberberg north of Schaumburg
 Nesselberg (c. 225 m), and Schaumburg Castle on a spur of the Möncheberg east of Schaumburg
 Möncheberg (326,1 m), and the Paschenburg Guest House between Schaumburg and Hessisch Oldendorf-Rohdental

Panorama

Towns and villages 

 Auetal (north)
 Bad Eilsen (north)
 Bückeburg (north)
 Heeßen (north)
 Hessisch Oldendorf (south)
 Minden (north)
 Porta Westfalica (south, west and north)
 Rinteln (south)
 Vlotho (southwest)

Literature 
Bundesanstalt für Landeskunde und Raumforschung: Geographische Landesaufnahme 1:200000. Naturräumliche Gliederung Deutschlands. Die naturräumlichen Einheiten auf Blatt 85 Minden. Bad Godesberg 1959

External links 
Aerial photograph of the western Weser Hills at Google Maps 
Aktionsgemeinschaft Weserbergland

References 

Central Uplands
Mountains and hills of North Rhine-Westphalia
Hill ranges of Lower Saxony
Weser Uplands
Natural regions of the Weser-Leine Uplands